The Samoa hotspot is a volcanic hotspot located in the south Pacific Ocean.
The hotspot model describes a hot upwelling plume of magma through the Earth's crust as an explanation of how volcanic islands are formed. The hotspot idea came from J. Tuzo Wilson in 1963 based on the Hawaiian Islands volcanic chain.

In theory, the Samoa hotspot is based on the Pacific Tectonic Plate traveling over a fixed hotspot located deep underneath the Samoan Islands.
The Samoa hotspot includes the Samoan Islands (American Samoa and Samoa), and extends to the islands of Uvea or Wallis Island (Wallis and Futuna) and Niulakita (Tuvalu), as well as the submerged Pasco banks and Alexa Bank.

As the Pacific Plate moves slowly over the hotspot, thermal activity builds up and is released in magma plume spewing through the Earth's crust, forming each island in a chain. The Samoa islands generally lie in a straight line, east to west, in the same direction of the tectonic plate 'drifting' over the hotspot.

A characteristic of a “classic” hotspot, like the Hawaiʻi hotspot, results in islands located further from the hotspot being progressively older with newer and younger islands closest to the fixed hotspot, like the Kamaʻehuakanaloa Seamount (formerly Lōʻihi), the only submarine volcano which has been studied in detail by scientists. The scientific research from Kamaʻehuakanaloa has resulted in a 'Hawaiʻi' model for hotspots primarily limited to the information gathered from the Hawaiian Islands.

However, the Samoa hotspot is currently an enigma for scientists. In the Samoa Islands, the easternmost island of Taʻū and the westernmost island of Savaiʻi have both erupted in the past 150 years. The most recent eruption on Savaiʻi occurred with Mount Matavanu (1905–1911) and on Taʻū in 1866.

Vailulu'u
In 1975, geophysicist Rockne Johnson discovered the Vailuluʻu Seamount, 45 km east of Taʻū island in American Samoa which has since been studied by an international team of scientists. Within the summit crater of Vailuluʻu is an active underwater volcanic cone called Nafanua, named after a war goddess in Samoan mythology.  The study of Vailuluʻu provides scientists with another possible model for hotspots as an alternative to the Hawaiʻi hotspot model.

An important difference between Vailuluʻu and Kamaʻehuakanaloa in Hawaiʻi, is a total lack of tholeiitic basalt compositions at Vailuluʻu although both are located at the easternmost point of their respective island chains.

The northern Tonga Islands (Vavaʻu and Niuatoputapu) are moving away from Fiji on the Australian plate at rates of about 130 mm/yr and 160 mm/yr, respectively, while Niue and Rarotonga on the Pacific plate are approaching the Australian plate at about 80 mm/yr. This implies that Pacific plate is tearing at the corner of the trench-transform boundary at a rate that is the sum of these two (160 + 80) 240 mm/yr.

See also
 Arago hotspot
 Rarotonga hotspot

References 

Hotspots of the Pacific Ocean
Geology of Oceania
Geography of Samoa
Geography of American Samoa
Geography of Oceania